Turmeric is a flowering plant, Curcuma longa, of the ginger family, Zingiberaceae, the rhizomes of which are used in cooking. Plants are gathered each year for their rhizomes, some for propagation in the following season and some for consumption.

The rhizomes are used fresh or boiled in water and dried, after which they are ground into a deep orange-yellow powder commonly used as a coloring and flavoring agent in many Asian cuisines, especially for curries, as well as for dyeing, characteristics imparted by the principal turmeric constituent, curcumin.

Turmeric powder has a warm, bitter, black pepper-like flavor and earthy, mustard-like aroma.

Curcumin, a bright yellow chemical produced by the turmeric plant, is approved as a food additive by the World Health Organization, European Parliament, and United States Food and Drug Administration.

Although long used in Ayurvedic medicine, where it is also known as haridra, there is no high-quality clinical evidence that consuming turmeric or curcumin is effective for treating any disease.

Origin and distribution
The greatest diversity of Curcuma species by number alone is in India, at around 40 to 45 species. Thailand has a comparable 30 to 40 species. Other countries in tropical Asia also have numerous wild species of Curcuma. Recent studies have also shown that the taxonomy of Curcuma longa is problematic, with only the specimens from South India being identifiable as C. longa. The phylogeny, relationships, intraspecific and interspecific variation, and even identity of other species and cultivars in other parts of the world still need to be established and validated. Various species currently utilized and sold as "turmeric" in other parts of Asia have been shown to belong to several physically similar taxa, with overlapping local names.

History
Turmeric has been used in Asia for centuries and is a major part of Ayurveda, Siddha medicine, traditional Chinese medicine, Unani, and the animistic rituals of Austronesian peoples. It was first used as a dye, and then later for its supposed properties in folk medicine.

From India, it spread to Southeast Asia along with Hinduism and Buddhism, as the yellow dye is used to color the robes of monks and priests. Turmeric has also been found in Tahiti, Hawaii and Easter Island before European contact. There is linguistic and circumstantial evidence of the spread and use of turmeric by the Austronesian peoples into Oceania and Madagascar. The populations in Polynesia and Micronesia, in particular, never came into contact with India, but use turmeric widely for both food and dye. Thus independent domestication events are also likely.

Turmeric was found in Farmana, dating to between 2600 and 2200 BCE, and in a merchant's tomb in Megiddo, Israel, dating from the second millennium BCE. It was noted as a dye plant in the Assyrians' Cuneiform medical texts from Ashurbanipal’s library at Nineveh from 7th century BCE. In Medieval Europe, turmeric was called "Indian saffron."

Etymology
It may be of Latin origin,  ("meritorious earth").

Botanical description

Appearance
It has highly branched, yellow to orange, cylindrical, aromatic rhizomes.

The leaves are alternate and arranged in two rows. They are divided into leaf sheath, petiole, and leaf blade. From the leaf sheaths, a false stem is formed.

Inflorescence, flower, and fruit
At the top of the inflorescence, stem bracts are present on which no flowers occur; these are white to green and sometimes tinged reddish-purple, and the upper ends are tapered.

The hermaphrodite flowers are zygomorphic and threefold. While the average corolla lobe is larger than the two lateral, only the median stamen of the inner circle is fertile. The dust bag is spurred at its base. All other stamens are converted to staminodes. The outer staminodes are shorter than the labellum. Three carpels are under a constant, trilobed ovary adherent, which is sparsely hairy. The fruit capsule opens with three compartments.

In East Asia, the flowering time is usually in August.

Phytochemistry

Turmeric powder is about 60–70% carbohydrates, 6–13% water, 6–8% protein, 5–10% fat, 3–7% dietary minerals, 3–7% essential oils, 2–7% dietary fiber, and 1–6% curcuminoids. The golden yellow color of turmeric is due to curcumin.

Phytochemical components of turmeric include diarylheptanoids, a class including numerous curcuminoids, such as curcumin, demethoxycurcumin, and bisdemethoxycurcumin. Curcumin constitutes up to 3.14% of assayed commercial samples of turmeric powder (the average was 1.51%); curry powder contains much less (an average of 0.29%). Some 34 essential oils are present in turmeric, among which turmerone, germacrone, atlantone, and zingiberene are major constituents.

Uses

Culinary

Turmeric is one of the key ingredients in many Asian dishes, imparting a mustard-like, earthy aroma and pungent, slightly bitter flavor to foods. It is used mostly in savory dishes, but also is used in some sweet dishes, such as the cake sfouf. In India, turmeric leaf is used to prepare special sweet dishes, patoleo, by layering rice flour and coconut-jaggery mixture on the leaf, then closing and steaming it in a special utensil (chondrõ). Most turmeric is used in the form of rhizome powder to impart a golden yellow color. It is used in many products such as canned beverages, baked products, dairy products, ice cream, yogurt, yellow cakes, orange juice, biscuits, popcorn, cereals, sauces, and gelatin. It is a principal ingredient in curry powders. Although typically used in its dried, powdered form, turmeric also is used fresh, like ginger. It has numerous uses in East Asian recipes, such as a pickle that contains large chunks of fresh soft turmeric.

Turmeric is used widely as a spice in South Asian and Middle Eastern cooking. Various Iranian khoresh recipes begin with onions caramelized in oil and turmeric. The Moroccan spice mix ras el hanout typically includes turmeric. In South Africa, turmeric is used to give boiled white rice a golden color, known as geelrys (yellow rice) traditionally served with bobotie. In Vietnamese cuisine, turmeric powder is used to color and enhance the flavors of certain dishes, such as bánh xèo, bánh khọt, and mì Quảng. The staple Cambodian curry paste, kroeung, used in many dishes, including fish amok, typically contains fresh turmeric. In Indonesia, turmeric leaves are used for Minang or Padang curry base of Sumatra, such as rendang, sate padang, and many other varieties. In the Philippines, turmeric is used in the preparation and cooking of kuning, satti, and some variants of adobo. In Thailand, fresh turmeric rhizomes are used widely in many dishes, in particular in the southern Thai cuisine, such as yellow curry and turmeric soup. Turmeric is used in a hot drink called "turmeric latte" or "golden milk" that is made with milk, frequently coconut milk. The turmeric milk drink known as haldi doodh (haldi means turmeric in Hindi) is a traditional indian recipe. Sold in the US and UK, the drink known as "golden milk" uses nondairy milk and sweetener, and sometimes black pepper after the traditional recipe (which may also use ghee).

Turmeric is approved for use as a food color, assigned the code E100. The oleoresin is used for oil-containing products.

In combination with annatto (E160b), turmeric has been used to color numerous food products. Turmeric is used to give a yellow color to some prepared mustards, canned chicken broths, and other foodsoften as a much cheaper replacement for saffron.

Traditional uses

In 2019, the European Medicines Agency concluded that turmeric herbal teas, or other forms taken by mouth, on the basis of their long-standing traditional use, could be used to relieve mild digestive problems, such as feelings of fullness and flatulence.

Turmeric grows wild in the forests of South and Southeast Asia, where it is collected for use in classical Indian medicine (Siddha or Ayurveda). The Haldi ceremony called  in Bengal (literally "yellow on the body") is a ceremony observed during wedding celebrations of people of Indian culture all throughout the Indian subcontinent.

In Tamil Nadu and Andhra Pradesh, as a part of the Tamil–Telugu marriage ritual, dried turmeric tuber tied with string is used to create a Thali necklace. In western and coastal India, during weddings of the Marathi and Konkani people, Kannada Brahmins, turmeric tubers are tied with strings by the couple to their wrists during a ceremony, Kankana Bandhana.

Turmeric makes a poor fabric dye, as it is not light fast, but is commonly used in Indian clothing, such as saris and Buddhist monks' robes. Friedrich Ratzel reported in The History of Mankind during 1896, that in Micronesia, turmeric powder was applied for embellishment of body, clothing, utensils, and ceremonial uses. Native Hawaiians who introduced it to Hawaii make a bright yellow dye out of it.

Indicator

Turmeric paper, also called curcuma paper or in German literature, Curcumapapier, is paper steeped in a tincture of turmeric and allowed to dry. It is used in chemical analysis as an indicator for acidity and alkalinity. The paper is yellow in acidic and neutral solutions and turns brown to reddish-brown in alkaline solutions, with transition between pH of 7.4 and 9.2.

Adulteration
As turmeric and other spices are commonly sold by weight, the potential exists for powders of toxic, cheaper agents with a similar color to be added, such as lead(II,IV) oxide ("red lead"). These additives give turmeric an orange-red color instead of its native gold-yellow, and such conditions led the US Food and Drug Administration (FDA) to issue import alerts from 2013 to 2019 on turmeric originating in India and Bangladesh. Lead detection in turmeric products led to recalls across the United States, Canada, Japan, Korea, and the United Kingdom through 2016.

Lead chromate, a bright yellow chemical compound, was found as an adulterant of turmeric in Bangladesh, where turmeric is used commonly in foods and the contamination levels were up to 500 times higher than the national limit. Researchers identified a chain of sources adulterating the turmeric with lead chromate: from farmers to merchants selling low-grade turmeric roots to "polishers" who added lead chromate for yellow color enhancement, to wholesalers for market distribution, all unaware of the potential consequences of lead toxicity.

Another common adulterant in turmeric, metanil yellow (also known as acid yellow 36), is considered by the British Food Standards Agency as an illegal dye for use in foods.

Medical research

Turmeric and curcumin have been studied in numerous clinical trials for various human diseases and conditions, with no high-quality evidence of any anti-disease effect or health benefit. There is no scientific evidence that curcumin reduces inflammation, . There is weak evidence that turmeric extracts may be beneficial for relieving symptoms of knee osteoarthritis, as well as for reducing pain and muscle damage following physical exercise. There is good evidence that turmeric is an allergen.

See also

 Alpinia zerumbet
 Curcuma xanthorrhiza
 Curcuma zedoaria
 Domesticated plants and animals of Austronesia
 Etlingera elatior
 Kaempferia galanga

References

External links
 

longa
Flora of tropical Asia
Spices
Rhizomatous plants
Crops originating from India
Food additives
Food colorings
Indian spices
Plant dyes
Plants used in Ayurveda
Plants described in 1753
Sri Lankan spices
Taxa named by Carl Linnaeus